Pat Boas is an American contemporary artist. She holds a Bachelor of Fine Arts degree from Pacific Northwest College of Art and a Master of Fine Arts degree from Portland State University, where she currently teaches and serves as the Director of the School of Art + Design.

Career 
Boas' drawings, paintings, prints and digital projects explore the act of reading and the obliteration and confusion of meaning in language.
Her work was exhibited in the 2016 Portland Biennial, curated by Michelle Grabner.
From 2002 to 2006, Boas was a contributing editor for Artweek and has also been an art critic for Artweek, Art Papers, and artUS.

Teaching 
Boas teaches in the Master of Fine Arts in Contemporary Art Practice program at Portland State University in Portland, Oregon and, from 2007 until 2012, served as the program's coordinator. Her pedagogy frequently fosters exchange between practices in art and writing. She regularly teaches a graduate seminar on the artist as writer and, in 2012, she began the publication [STUDIO] with Kristan Kennedy and Lisa Radon, in which students in the Portland State University Contemporary Art Practice MFA program respond to works, lectures, and studio meetings from visiting artists.

Awards and accolades 
 2014 – Regional Arts & Culture Council Artist Project Grant for collaborative drawing with Linda Hutchins and Linda Austin
 2012 – Bonnie Bronson Fellowship
 2012 – Pollock-Krasner Foundation Fellowship for Byrdcliffe Artist Colony Residency
 2012 – Ford Family Foundation Golden Spot Award for Crow’s Shadow Artist Residency
 2011 – Ford Family Foundation Connective Conversations Critic’s Studio Visit Award, School of Architecture and Allied Arts, University of Oregon
 2009 – Regional Arts & Culture Council Project Grant for exhibition catalog
 2009 – Grant for Record Record catalog, Harold and Arlene Schnitzer CARE Foundation
 2006 – Jurors’ Award, 2006 Oregon Biennial, Portland Art Museum
 2005 – Professional Development Grant, Regional Arts & Culture Council
 2005 – Professional Development Grant, Pacific Northwest College of Art
 2002 – Artist Project Grant, Regional Arts & Culture Council
 2001 – Drawing Residency, Oregon College of Art & Craft
 2001 – Installation Art Space Grant, Regional Arts & Culture Council, Portland, OR

Work in collections 
 Bonnie Bronson Collection
 RACC Portable Works Collection

References

External links

Living people
Artists from Portland, Oregon
Pacific Northwest College of Art alumni
Portland State University alumni
University of Akron alumni
Year of birth missing (living people)
Portland State University faculty
American digital artists